Jujutsu Kaisen 0 is a Japanese manga series written and illustrated by Gege Akutami. The manga, which was originally titled Tokyo Metropolitan Curse Technical School, was serialized in Shueisha's magazine Jump GIGA from April to July 2017. After Akutami launched Jujutsu Kaisen in 2018, the series was retitled Jujutsu Kaisen 0—making it a prequel—and released in a single tankōbon volume in December 2018. It was licensed for English release in North America by Viz Media. The series follows Yuta Okkotsu, a young student who becomes a sorcerer and seeks to control the cursed spirit of his childhood friend Rika Orimoto.

Akutami wrote the series with no themes to follow but wanted to write and draw cool-looking characters. They were often supported by their two editors while writing the manga. The manga was a commercial success in both Japan and North America. Critical response to the manga was generally positive; several reviewers praised Yuta's role and his relationship with Rika. Critics found Yuta more compelling than Jujutsu Kaisens Yuji Itadori who, while having several similarities with Yuta, has different characterizations. The relationships of the main cast were also well-received and the manga's artwork was praised.

Jujutsu Kaisen 0 received an anime film adaptation by MAPPA, which was directed by Sunghoo Park and premiered in Japan in December 2021. It was followed by a novelization and a new gag chapter written by Akutami.

Plot

Yuta Okkotsu is a timid, 16-year-old, high-school student who is haunted by Rika Orimoto, the cursed spirit of his childhood friend who died six years prior; they had promised to get married when they grew up. Whenever Yuta is bullied, Rika comes to his defense and violently kills his attackers. In November 2016, Yuta meets Satoru Gojo, a jujutsu sorcerer under whose guidance he joins the Tokyo Prefectural Jujutsu High School to learn how to control Rika. There, Yuta meets the sorcerers Panda, Maki Zen'in, and Toge Inumaki, who try exorcising Rika but are easily stopped by her. Yuta starts training with Maki, who mentors him in swordsmanship. During a mission, Maki motivates Yuta to fight if he wants to be accepted, which causes him to briefly control Rika to destroy a cursed spirit.

As three months pass, Yuta becomes more skilled, and is able to control Rika and develop a closer relationship with his fellow students. In a mission with Toge, Yuta is spotted by Suguru Geto, a powerful enemy sorcerer who was previously friends with Gojo, and wishes to eliminate all non-sorcerers. Launching an attack on jujutsu society, Geto invades the school to take Rika by force. Fearing for Yuta's safety, Gojo sends Panda and Toge to the school, where they and Maki clash with Geto, who severely wounds them. Angered, Yuta releases Rika and promises to give her his soul if she helps him defeat their enemy. In the aftermath, Geto has escaped, but is grievously injured and missing an arm. He is found by Gojo, who thanks him for intentionally sparing the students. Both reflect on their old friendship.

After the battle, Yuta is surprised to find himself still alive. Gojo explains Rika did not curse Yuta; rather, when Rika died, Yuta accidentally cursed her using hidden energy he inherited from the figure Sugawara no Michizane, forcing her to remain by his side. Rika peacefully passes to the afterlife, asking an apologetic Yuta to live a full life. Yuta continues his work as a sorcerer with his friends, still wearing Rika's engagement's ring.

Production

In 2017, Gege Akutami suffered writer's block in regards to what he do in his manga, having lost the motivation he had when reading My Hero Academia and Hinomaru Sumo. He presented to a horror-like manga in its prototype storyboard to his editor Yamanaka. Yuta and Rika remained in the same form as in the final product. The concept of the story was creating sorcerers who would be able to stop Yuta and Rika from killing others. Rather than Satoru Gojo, the character meant to recruit Yuta was Maki Zen'in. Yuta's relatives were meant to be included into the story, most notably his sister who would be taken by Rika over jealousy. Although several changes were made until the official version, Akutami believes it  should have kept the original concept. Yamanaka was interested by the storyboard and talked to other members from Shueisha about it. However, Akutami was stressed about expectations. 

Akutami's first editor claimed the story was interesting but too dark and persuaded him give it a school setting much to his anger. When learning that the manga would be written in the Jump Giga over the more famous Weekly Shōnen Jump, Akutami was saddened by this decision and kept silent rather than argue over it. Akutami was still motivated when remembering that Mikki Yuki became famous in Jump Giga for writing Ginata Shiki. When Jujutsu Kaisen 0 was being written, the editor criticized the handling of Rika, believing a darker figure would be more suitable for the story, such as Oda Nobunaga. Yamanaka was transferred after the first chapter was published. The concept of Rika was that of an ordinary girl who would come across as evil when being remembered. Akutami placed hidden references to other works like Tite Kubo's Zombiepowder. while the first scene of Yuta being interrogated was influenced by the anime series Neon Genesis Evangelion. Akutami wanted to avoid a protagonist like himself due to his lack of credits but was still active. The plot was given training scenes and jokes to balance the story. Several parts of the manga were based on real life. The side character Ichiji and Yaga were based on people the author made. On the other hand, the ranking of sorcerers were made to contrast Akutami's high school which did not have such style.

The third and fourth chapters were given a feeling of "climax" to reference it if there ever was a need to give it a series. While Akutami aimed to have several ideas, he realized by the third chapter that he committed a mistake as a result of relying on several characters. As a result, the story was revised into sorcerers being a minority. The original idea behind Rika was that she would become stronger the more time she spends with Yuta. However, this was revised under the advice of Akutami's superiors in order to give the manga a more proper ending. Yuta's unique white uniform was made to reference problematic students but wears a black one in the final pages to fit with his classmates. Nevertheless, Akutami planned that once Yuta would return in Jujutsu Kaisen, he would once again wear a white uniform in hopes older readers would remember him.

During publication of the monthly series, Akutami had no intention of having his series published in Weekly Shōnen Jump. The positive response to Tokyo Metropolitan Curse Technical School, however, led him to turn the series into the main manga, Jujutsu Kaisen. When starting this series, Akutami had not planned any themes for the narrative but had the idea of giving the characters a cool appeal. The narrative of Jujutsu Kaisen 0 became connected with the other manga, with the final chapter being conceived as soon as he started writing it. He said, however, he was not sure about the possibility of properly connecting the beginning with the ending.

Yuta and Rika, the first characters created, were intended as a combination for the manga. Akutami found that the early design of Yuta was so similar to that of fellow jujutsu sorcerer Megumi Fushiguro they might confuse readers. He noted the same similarities between Inumaki and Yuji Itadori. As a result, Akutami changed Yuta's look for the main series. Akutami included a line about Michizane Sugawara, a famous figure in Japanese history who is mentioned as Yuta and Gojo's predecessor, as a tribute to a late editor Yamanaka. When Yuta comforts Maki in the third chapter to the point she cries, the new editor Katayama said he liked it too much because he felt Yuta really understood Maki's feelings. Akutami decided to revise this scene in the storyboard following his editor's praise. He also said Suguru Geto is a strong villain, believing he could have won his fight against Yuta if he had destroyed the supernatural barrier between Shinjuku and Kyoto. Sugawara was added under the advice that the series should feature a real person.

Release
The four-chapter series Tokyo Metropolitan Curse Technical School, was published in Shueisha's magazine Jump GIGA from April 28 to July 28, 2017. The chapters were later published in a single tankōbon volume that was retroactively titled Jujutsu Kaisen 0 and released along with the third volume of Jujutsu Kaisen on December 4, 2018. A nine-page one-shot chapter, following the daily lives of Yuta and the other first-year students, was included in a "Jujutsu Kaisen #0.5 Tokyo Prefectural Jujutsu High School" booklet, released in December 2021, to promote the film adaptation of the story. During the month, Shueisha also released an alternative cover featuring Yuta and Yuji to connect it with the first volume of Jujutsu Kaisen.

In North America, Viz Media announced the English language release of the volume in July 2020. The volume was published on January 5, 2021.

Adaptations

Sunghoo Park, who directed the first season of the series' anime adaptation, originally wanted to cover Yuta's story in the first few episodes of the Jujutsu Kaisen anime but decided to begin the show with Yuji's introduction to the world of sorcerers and curses. After the finale of the first season of Jujutsu Kaisen anime television series, an anime film adaptation of Jujutsu Kaisen 0 was announced. As with the Jujutsu Kaisen television series, the film is produced by MAPPA and directed by Park. The film is distributed by Toho and premiered on December 24, 2021. Park said the movie includes new content that is not in the original Jujutsu Kaisen 0 manga. Film's scriptwriter Hiroshi Seko commented they wanted to alter the focus on Yuta's growth in the movie due to the difference in length.

A novel adaptation of  Jujutsu Kaisen 0, which was written by Baraddo Kitaguni and based on a script by Hiroshi Seko, was published on the same day as the film's premiere, December 24, 2021.

Reception

Sales
Jujutsu Kaisen 0 sold 70,774 print copies in its first week. According to Oricon, the manga has sold over 1.6 million copies between November 23, 2020, and May 23, 2021. It had sold over 1.9 million copies by November 2021. The volume was also popular with ICv2, noticing the manga's sudden popularity in Western regions might be connected to its release in January 2021. The book was listed 13th in The New York Times''' monthly Graphic Books list in January 2022. It once again took the 14th place in May 2022.  In the NPD Group, the manga was ranked as the fifth-best-selling manga between late November 2021 and early January 2022.

Critical response
Critics have commented about the manga's narrative. Since it was released after the earlier volumes, Anime News Network and The Mary Sue said Yuta is often mentioned in Jujutsu Kaisen, making his introduction in the prequel intriguing. Manga News enjoyed the focus on Yuta's tragic romance and their deep bond in the prequel, and hoped he might return in Jujutsu Kaisen. The site said the story reached a proper conclusion. Boston Bartand Brigade and Otaquest said Yuta is a more appealing character than Yuji Itadori due to their different curses, which Otaquest said makes Yuji simple, like Ichigo Kurosaki from Bleach'', in contrast to the more compelling Yuta. Bleeding Cool regarded it as a story worth recommending for Valentine's Day. Comic Book Resources enjoyed the handling of Yuta's curse and his relationship with the antagonistic Geto.

The Mary Sue saw parallels between Yuji and Yuta, both of whom deal with a curse they are trying to get rid of, although Yuta's growth makes him appealing because he stops wanting to die and appreciates his life. According to the reviewer, Yuta's cursing of Rika rather than the reverse felt like a strong twist. The supporting characters Maki, Panda and Inumaki were praised for developing alongside Yuta; Real Sound particularly praised the bond the Jujutsu sorcerers have in general; in one volume, it is shown Maki trains Yuta and befriends in the process, which gives further depth to the main manga. Otaquest lamented the demoted roles of the supporting characters in the finale when they are defeated by Geto but noted the manga helps readers to further understand them. Despite Gojo being identical to his regular persona, critics found the pilot helps to further explore his past as a result of his tragic relationship with Geto, which reveals a major twist in the main series. Geto's link with Yuta through the late Sugawara no Michizane made Real Sound wonder if Akutami had planned to develop such character in the main series because it helps explain why the protagonist and his mentor are so powerful.

Comic Book Resources stated the manga's artwork was well executed to portray the character's emotions and the story's dark elements. Manga News also found the art interesting, especially the character designs, but often noted its strange proportions. The art was favorably compared with the sequel as Akutami's sharp line goes very well. The fight scenes were generally well-regarded by critics, which include the handling of limbs and explosions.

Notes

References

Bibliography

External links
 

Adventure anime and manga
Dark fantasy anime and manga
Exorcism in anime and manga
Prequel comics
Shōnen manga
Shueisha manga
Supernatural anime and manga
Viz Media manga
Yōkai in anime and manga